Fatehpur is one of the 68 constituencies in the Himachal Pradesh Legislative Assembly. It is a part of Kangra Lok Sabha constituency.

Members of Legislative Assembly

Election results 
2022

2021 by-election 
A by-election was needed for this constituency due to the death of the sitting MLA, Sujan Singh Pathania, on 13 February 2021.

2017

See also
 Kangra district
 List of constituencies of Himachal Pradesh Legislative Assembly

References

External links
 

Assembly constituencies of Himachal Pradesh
Kangra district